, known professionally as Joji and formerly for playing the characters Filthy Frank and Pink Guy, is an Australian-Japanese singer-songwriter, rapper, former comedian, and YouTuber. Miller's music has been described as a mix between R&B, lo-fi, and trip hop. 

Miller created "The Filthy Frank Show" on YouTube in 2011 shortly after moving to the United States, gaining recognition for playing oddball characters on the comedy channels TVFilthyFrank, TooDamnFilthy, and DizastaMusic. The channels, which featured comedy hip hop, rants, extreme challenges, and ukulele and dance performances, are noted for their shock humor and prolific virality. Miller's videos helped popularize the Harlem Shake, which contributed to the commercial success of Baauer's song of the same name which led to the production of memes and collaborations with YouTubers. As Pink Guy, Miller released two comedy studio albums and an extended play between 2014 and 2017.

In late 2017, Miller ended "The Filthy Frank Show" to pursue a music career under the name Joji. His debut album, Ballads 1, was released in 2018 and featured the single "Slow Dancing in the Dark". His second album, Nectar (2020), contained the singles "Sanctuary" and "Run". In 2022, he released the US Billboard Hot 100 top-ten single "Glimpse of Us", his highest-charting song, which was later featured on his third album, Smithereens (2022).

Early life 
George Kusunoki Miller was born in Osaka, Japan. His father is Australian and his mother is Japanese. He attended Canadian Academy, an international school in Kobe, Japan, where he graduated in 2012. At age 18, he left Japan and travelled to the United States.

YouTube career

The Filthy Frank Show (2011–2017) 
Miller created the "Filthy Frank" character during his time on his DizastaMusic YouTube channel, on which he created sketch comedy-based content. The channel started gaining popularity after his 2012 conceptualization of Filthy Frank, a character who was described as the anti-vlogger of YouTube by Miller. The first known video on this particular channel (before his creation of the Frank character) was uploaded on 19 June 2008, and was titled "Lil Jon falls off a table". The DizastaMusic channel has over 1 million subscribers and 177 million views . On 15 August 2014, Miller uploaded a video to the DizastaMusic channel announcing that he would not be posting any more video content onto the channel due to the risk of losing the channel due to the numerous copyright and community strikes it received. He also announced that future "Filthy Frank" content would be uploaded to a new channel he had created called TVFilthyFrank.

Miller's channel TVFilthyFrank had many different series, such as "Food" (和食ラップ), "Japanese 101", "Wild Games" and "Loser Reads Hater Comments". This channel currently has a total of 7.76 million subscribers and over one billion views . Miller created a third channel, TooDamnFilthy, on 1 July 2014. On this channel he had two series, "Japanese 101", which was also featured on his main channel, and "Cringe of the Week", which was usually abbreviated to "COTW". , TooDamnFilthy has 2.33 million subscribers and 332 million views.

Miller made attempts to maintain his privacy, such as deleting the video "Filthy Frank Exposes Himself?", where he revealed himself to be a college student in Brooklyn, New York City, and that he did not want to reveal personal information for fear of not being able to get a job later on due to the nature of his show.

On 27 September 2017, Miller announced the release of his first and currently only book, titled Francis of the Filth, which addresses things uncovered in The Filthy Frank Show, and serves as a culmination of the series.

On 29 December 2017, Miller released a statement on Twitter explaining that he had stopped producing Filthy Frank content due to both "serious health conditions" and his lack of interest in continuing the show. In September 2018, Miller stated in a BBC Radio 1 interview that he had no choice but to stop producing comedy due to his health condition.

Music career

Pink Guy (2014–2017) 

Miller always had a passion for music composition. He has expressed that even before his YouTube career, he had an interest in creating music and created his YouTube channel as a means of promoting it. In an interview with Pigeons and Planes, he said, "I've always wanted to make normal music. I just started the YouTube channel to kind of bump my music. But then Filthy Frank and the Pink Guy stuff ended up getting way bigger than I thought so I had to kind of roll with it."

Miller's music under Pink Guy is often comical, staying true to the nature of his YouTube channel. His debut album, Pink Season, debuted at number 70 on the Billboard 200. Under his comedy rap stage name, Pink Guy, Miller has produced one mixtape, one album, and one extended play, Pink Guy, Pink Season, and Pink Season: The Prophecy, respectively. On 16 March 2017, Miller performed for the first time as Pink Guy at SXSW. Future plans were stated to include a "long overdue" tour, a third Pink Guy album and more progress on his personal music outside of the Pink Guy character.

However, as of 29 December 2017, Joji has ceased production of all Filthy Frank-related content, including Pink Guy music.

Joji (2015–present) 
Aside from the comedic and often rap-based music he created under the Pink Guy alias, Miller also created more serious and traditional music under another stage name, Joji, which became his primary focus in late 2017. Speaking on his transition from his YouTube career to his music career as Joji, Miller said to Billboard "now I get to do stuff that I want to hear." In the article by Billboard, he specified that 'Joji' isn't a character like Filthy Frank and Pink Guy. "I guess that's the difference," he continues. "Joji's just me."

During his time growing up in Higashinada-ku, Kobe, Japan, Miller began to produce music and sing with friends as a side-hobby and a way to pass the time. After relocating to Manhattan, New York, Miller expanded upon his music career by starting his Pink Guy persona, which paved the way for his Joji persona. Miller originally announced his Joji album on 3 May 2014 alongside the first Pink Guy album. However, Miller subtly cancelled the project until he began releasing music under the name PinkOmega. Miller released two songs as PinkOmega: "Dumplings" on 4 June 2015 and "wefllagn.ii 5" on 28 August 2015, both of which were later released on the Pink Guy album Pink Season, the latter being re-titled "We Fall Again".

Miller intended to keep the music made under Joji a secret from his fanbase due to them mainly wanting his comedic music. In late 2015, two singles were released, titled "Thom" and "You Suck Charlie"; both were released under a false alias, but it was quickly leaked that the user behind the account was Miller, which prompted him in January 2016 to publicly announce on Instagram that he was releasing a full-length commercial project titled Chloe Burbank: Volume 1. In the same post, he linked his SoundCloud account.

Joji began releasing music under 88rising in 2017; the songs "I Don't Wanna Waste My Time" (on 26 April), "Rain on Me" (on 19 July), and "Will He" (on 17 October). Joji was featured in the song "Nomadic" with the Chinese rap group Higher Brothers. Miller performed live as Joji for the first time on 18 May 2017 in Los Angeles. The event was streamed by the Boiler Room. On 17 October 2017, Miller released the debut single from his debut commercial project, In Tongues. The single, titled "Will He", was released on platforms Spotify and iTunes.

Miller's debut project under the moniker Joji, an EP titled In Tongues, was released on 3 November 2017 by Empire Distribution. A deluxe version of the EP was released on 14 February 2018 with 8 remixes of songs from the EP along with the release of "Plastic Taste" and "I Don't Wanna Waste My Time" as part of the track listing. Joji released the song "Yeah Right" in May 2018, becoming his first to chart on a Billboard chart, peaking at 23 on the Billboard R&B Songs chart.

Miller debuted Ballads 1 under the label 88rising on 26 October 2018, which quickly peaked the Billboard Top R&B/Hip Hop Albums Chart. Shortly after its release, Miller announced a North American tour, spanning 9 dates in early 2019. At that time, he was already on tour for Ballads 1 in Europe. On 4 June 2019, Miller announced his new single titled "Sanctuary" through his Instagram page and released it on 14 June. It was accompanied by a music video, which was uploaded to 88rising's official YouTube channel.

Joji was featured in the song "Where Does the Time Go?" with Indonesian rapper Rich Brian on his second album The Sailor. On 30 January 2020, Miller announced another new single, "Run", which released at midnight on 6 February, alongside a music video released later that day. On 2 March, he performed the song on The Tonight Show Starring Jimmy Fallon. On 16 April, Joji announced another new single, "Gimme Love", which released at midnight, and along with announced his upcoming album Nectar, which was initially set to be released on 10 July 2020. However, on 12 June 2020, Joji announced that the album had been pushed back to 25 September 2020 due to the COVID-19 pandemic.

On 9 June 2022, Joji released a new single titled "Glimpse of Us", which peaked at number 8  on the Billboard Hot 100. On 26 August, he released a second single called Yukon (Interlude). On 4 November, Joji released his album Smithereens, alongside the single Die For You. To promote the album, Joji has been touring in North America since September 2022.

Artistry 
Joji's music has been described as trip hop and lo-fi that blends elements of trap, folk, electronic, and R&B. His songs have been characterized as having "down tempo, melancholic themes and soulful vocals" with "minimalistic production". Joji himself classifies his work as dark love songs, with his 2020 album, Nectar, dissecting cliché tropes and topics.

He has been compared to electronic artist James Blake, whom he has cited as an influence alongside Radiohead, Shlohmo and Donald Glover. In an interview with Pigeons and Planes, Miller said that his music was inspired by his time growing up in Osaka and by boom bap instrumentals he listened to while attending Canadian Academy.

Impact 

Miller's web-show has had a significant impact on internet culture and is responsible for creating many internet memes.
 
Filthy Frank has been hailed as "the epitome of odd." Miller's videos had widespread impact, which included starting a viral dance craze known as the Harlem Shake in 2013, which was directly responsible for the debut of Baauer's "Harlem Shake" song atop the Billboard Hot 100.

Discography

Studio albums

As Joji
 Ballads 1 (2018)
 Nectar (2020)
 Smithereens (2022)

As Pink Guy
 Pink Guy (2014)
 Pink Season (2017)

Tours
 Ballads 1 Tour (2018–2019)
 Nectar: The Finale (2021–2022)
 Smithereens Tour (2022–2023)

Awards and nominations

See also 

List of YouTubers

References

External links 
 
 

1992 births
Living people
Comedy YouTubers
Internet memes
Internet-related controversies
Japanese expatriates in the United States
Japanese comedy musicians
Japanese people of Australian descent
Australian expatriates in the United States
Australian comedy musicians
Musicians from Osaka
Obscenity controversies in music
Ukulele players
Surreal comedy
YouTube channels launched in 2008
YouTube channels closed in 2017
New York Institute of Technology alumni
Music YouTubers
English-language singers from Japan
Japanese YouTubers
Australian hip hop singers
Japanese hip hop singers
Japanese rappers
Australian male rappers
Australian male singer-songwriters
Japanese male singer-songwriters
Australian male comedians
Japanese male comedians
Trip hop musicians
Alternative R&B musicians
Australian contemporary R&B singers
Lo-fi musicians
Warner Records artists